Marine National Park in the Gulf of Kutch is situated on the southern shore of the Gulf of Kutch in the Devbhumi Dwarka district of Gujarat state, India. In 1980, an area of 270 km2 from Okha to Jodiya was declared Marine Sanctuary. Later, in 1982, a core area of 110 km2 was declared Marine National Park under the provisions of the Wildlife (protection) Act, 1972 of India. There are 42 islands on the Jamnagar coast in the Marine National Park, most of them surrounded by reefs. The best-known island is Pirotan.

Fauna

The fauna found here include:
70 species of sponges are found.
Coral 52 species including 44 
species of hard coral 10 species of soft coral and almost 90 species of birds.

Jellyfish, Portuguese man of war and sea anemones are other coelenterates found here.
Arthropods include 27 species of prawns, 30 species of crabs, lobsters, shrimps and other crustaceans.
Molluscs like pearl oysters and sea slugs are present. Octopus which change colour are also found.
Echinoderms like starfish, sea cucumbers and sea urchins are present.
The fishes found are puffer fishes, sea horse, sting ray, mudskippers and whale sharks which are an endangered species.
Endangered sea turtles such as green sea turtles, olive ridleys and leatherbacks are seen here. There are three species of sea snakes.
There are dugongs and smaller cetaceans like finless porpoises, common dolphins, bottlenose dolphins and Indo-Pacific humpback dolphins. Larger whales such as blue whales, sei whales are seen. Humpback whales, and sperm whales may have been almost wiped out due to illegal whaling by the Soviet Union and Japan. Whale sharks can be found in deeper areas. A surprisingly large scale greater flamingo colony, reaching up to 20,000 nests is known to occur along the gulf and many other birds species found here like crab plovers, sandpipers, western reef egret, great egret, ruff, eurasian oystercatcher, greenshanks, redshanks, gulls, skimmers, ducks, pelicans, storks, Godwits, terns. There are 42 islands in the Arabian Sea with coral reefs and the park is situated in one of those.

Biodiversity and conservation challenges
Marine National Park of Gulf of Kutchh is a fragile ecosystem. In recent years, biodiversity of marine park has been under threat on several scores like extraction of corals and sands by cement industries, increased turbidity of water, oil refineries, chemical industries and mechanised fishing boats. At present, 31 species of corals are reported in the Marine National Park (Kumar et al. 2014). There were two catastrophic and localised (Adhavan et al. 2014) bleaching events happened in this region.

See also
 Arid Forest Research Institute
 Coral reefs in India
 Indian Wild Ass Sanctuary
 List of national parks and wildlife sanctuaries of Gujarat, India

Notes and references

External links

 Kumar, J.S.Y., Marimuthu, N., Geetha, S., Satyanarayana, Ch., Venkataraman, K. and R.D. Kamboj. 2014. J Coast Conserv., 18: 167-175 Longitudinal variations of coral reef features in the Marine National Park, Gulf of Kachchh
 Adhavan, D., Kamboj, R.D., Marimuthu, N. and Bhalodi, M.M. 2014. Curr. Sci., 107(11): 1780-1781 Seasonal variation and climate change influence coral bleaching in Pirotan Island, Gulf of Kachchh Marine National Park, Gujarat
D. Adhavan, N. Marimuthu, S. Tikadar, K. Sivakumar. 2015. Impact of Algal Bloom on Mangroves and Coral Reef Ecosystemin Marine National Park, Gulf of Kachch, Gujarat, India. Journal of Marine Biology and Aquaculture - 1(2): 1-2.
 Tourist information about the Marine National Park
 Images Gulf of Kutch Marine National Park in Jamnagar
 Birds and Wildlife in Jamnagar
 Hard Corals Order:Scleractinia From Gulf of Kutch

National parks in Gujarat
Protected areas established in 1982
Marine parks of India
Tourist attractions in Jamnagar district
1982 establishments in Gujarat